The 1915 Auckland City mayoral election was part of the New Zealand local elections held that same year. In 1915, elections were held for the Mayor of Auckland plus other local government positions including twenty-one city councillors. The polling was conducted using the standard first-past-the-post electoral method.

Background
This was the first election following the Borough of Grey Lynn's amalgamation with Auckland City which saw the number of councillors increased from eighteen to twenty-one.

Mayoralty results

Councillor results

Notes

References

Mayoral elections in Auckland
1915 elections in New Zealand
Politics of the Auckland Region
1910s in Auckland